This is a representative list of notable academic, medical, and scientific journals in sexology (i.e., sexuality research) and its various subfields.

Currently in print

Discontinued

Annual Review of Sex Research (became an annual special issue of the Journal of Sex Research in 2009)
Electronic Journal of Human Sexuality (discontinued in 2015)
Jahrbuch für sexuelle Zwischenstufen (discontinued in 1933)
Journal of the Gay and Lesbian Medical Association (discontinued in 2002)

Sexology journals
sexology journals